Mohammad Bastenegar was an Iranian activist and spokesperson for the Council of Nationalist-Religious Activists of Iran.

He registered to run in the 1996 parliamentary election.

References

1941 births
2018 deaths
Freedom Movement of Iran politicians
Iranian religious-nationalists
Members of the Association for Defense of Freedom and the Sovereignty of the Iranian Nation